Linda Runbeck (born June 11, 1946) is an American politician who served as a member of the Minnesota House of Representatives from 1989 to 1993 and again from 2011 to 2021. She was also a member of the Minnesota Senate from 1993 to 2001.

Early life, education, and career
Runbeck earned a Bachelor of Arts degree in sociology and social work from Bethel University Arden Hills, Minnesota.

Career 
Prior to serving in the Minnesota Legislature, she was a member of the Circle Pines City Council. She was president of the Taxpayers League of Minnesota, served on the Northwest YMCA’s Advisory Board, receiving its Distinguished Leader Award in 2007, and was also development director at the Minnesota Free Market Institute. She has also been a frequent guest on Almanac, a weekly public affairs television show in Minnesota.

She previously worked as director of advertising for County Seat Stores and vice president for Dahlberg Incorporated, a hearing aid manufacturer. She later owned a Miracle-Ear hearing aid franchise. She and her husband Richard own Braham Monument Company in Braham, Minnesota.

Minnesota Legislature 
Runbeck served in the Minnesota Senate, representing District 53 from 1993 to 2001, leaving to make an unsuccessful run for the U.S. House of Representatives in Minnesota's 4th District in 2000 against Betty McCollum. She also served in the House previously, representing the old District 52A from 1989 to 1993 after winning a 1989 special election held after Rep. Gordon Voss resigned to accept an appointment by Governor Rudy Perpich as chief administrator of the Minnesota Metropolitan Waste Control Commission.

Runbeck was elected to the Minnesota House of Representatives in 2010 and re-elected in 2012, 2014, 2016, and 2018. She did not seek re-election in 2020 and was succeeded by Donald Raleigh.

Political positions
Runbeck is a conservative Republican, receiving a lifetime score of 89% from the American Conservative Union. She supported the 2012 amendments to the Minnesota State Constitution that intended to ban gay marriage and to require a photo ID to vote. Both of these proposals were later rejected by voters.

Runbeck opposes abortion and voted to ban them past 20 weeks. She has voted to reduce funding for public transportation. She supports lifting the moratorium on nuclear power in the state.

References

External links 

 Rep. Runbeck Web Page
 
 Project Votesmart – Rep. Linda Runbeck Profile
 Linda Runbeck Campaign Web Site

1946 births
Living people
People from Circle Pines, Minnesota
Republican Party members of the Minnesota House of Representatives
Republican Party Minnesota state senators
Women state legislators in Minnesota
American Lutherans
21st-century American politicians
21st-century American women politicians